The Philippine House Special Committee on Flagship Programs and Projects is a special committee of the Philippine House of Representatives.

Jurisdiction 
The committee's jurisdiction is on the monitoring, evaluation and review of highly-strategic infrastructure or programs and projects identified and approved by the National Economic and Development Authority (NEDA) Board Committee on Infrastructure and/or the Investment Coordination Committee and included in the General Appropriations Act, including to propose possible game-changing and high-impact flagship programs and projects and the necessity of recommending requisite courses of action in relation thereto.

Members, 18th Congress

See also 
 House of Representatives of the Philippines
 List of Philippine House of Representatives committees

References

External links 
House of Representatives of the Philippines

Flagship Programs and Projects